William John Thomson  (1771–1845) was an American-born painter of silhouettes, portraits and miniatures who was active in Great Britain.

Early life
Thomson was born in Savannah, Chatham County, Georgia, on 3 October 1771 to Scottish parents, Alexander Thomson and Mary Elizabeth Thomson née Spencer. Thomson's first sister Margaret was born in 1773, his second sister born in 1775 was Catherine Thomson,  later the stepmother of Elizabeth Gaskell. They migrated to England during the war of independence. His younger brother born in Edinburgh in 1778 was Anthony Todd Thomson the doctor who had delivered Gaskell. He moved to London and learned to paint. He exhibited at the Royal Academy of Arts in 1795. He married Helen J Colhoun in Edinburgh 12 May 1797, He was considered for election to the Royal Academy in 1808 He exhibited his work at The British Institution between 1809 - 1829 whilst living in London at 6 Charles Street, 41 Craven St and 111 The Strand.  In Edinburgh at 59 York Place and Northumberland Avenue. In 1812 he moved back to his ancestral home of Scotland and settled in Edinburgh. About 1817 he marries Anne McCulloch (d.1855). The two marriages produce seven children. After marriage they lived at 20 Dundas Street in the New Town.

Painting style

Thomson worked in a solemn, realistic, somewhat simplified style, devoid of the affectation that often characterised the work of his contemporaries. His subjects face slightly to the right; their features are emphatically delineated, the left eye appearing overly large. A pink tonality suffuses the paintings, reddish brown shading models the forms and brown hatching often makes up the background. Thomson was a miniaturist of very great eminence, although he sometimes exercised his talents on large portraits and small full-lengths. To accuracy of execution he added great richness of effect, preciousness of finish, and depth of tone.

Latter years
He became a prominent figure in the artistic life of Scotland, holding a variety of official positions. He exhibited portraits, miniatures, landscapes and genre paintings. 

On the 16th July 1823 his younger brother Anthony Todd Thomson submitted a request to Robert Dundas, 2nd Viscount Melville that Thomson succeeds the late Sir Henry Raeburn as the King's Limner for Scotland, (the post was given to David Wilkie ).

On 7 October 1829 he was elected academician of Royal Scottish Academy and is shown on their alphabetical list.

In 1831 as trustee to the estate of Hugh William Williams (Artist) along with Mrs Robina Williams, Aeneas MacBain WS, he organised a studio sale. 

In June 1832 he painted a miniature of his step niece Elizabeth Gaskell see below. (née Stevenson) author of Cranford. 

He lived at 47 Northumberland Street, Edinburgh in the 1830s until he died on 24 March 1845 He is buried at St John's Episcopal graveyard in Edinburgh. The grave lies on a south-facing wall at the west side of the lower terrace. His wife and children lie with him.

The memorial to his parents and grandparents is in Canongate Churchyard.

Family

He was married to Anne McCulloch (1783-1855).

Examples of his miniaturist and portraiture work

References

Further reading
 The Royal Scottish Academy, 1826–1916. A complete list of exhibited works.
 British Miniaturists by Basil Somerset Long. 1929.
 The Royal Scottish Academy exhibitors 1826–1990. A dictionary of artists.
 Profiles of the Past: William John Thomson
 Art UK: William John Thomson
 Philip Mould Historical Portraits Image Library
 Ellison Fine Art: fine portrait miniature specialist
 Genealogy of W J Thomson see p.10.

1771 births
1845 deaths
19th-century Scottish painters
Scottish portrait painters
Portrait miniaturists